Alex Kirsch (born 12 June 1992 in Luxembourg City) is a Luxembourgish cyclist, who currently rides for UCI WorldTeam . In August 2019, he was named in the startlist for the 2019 Vuelta a España.

Major results

2012
 1st  Road race, National Under-23 Road Championships
2013
 National Under-23 Road Championships
1st  Road race
1st  Time trial
 1st Stage 1 (TTT) Czech Cycling Tour
 1st  Mountains classification Flèche du Sud
2014
 National Under-23 Road Championships
1st  Road race
1st  Time trial
 3rd Time trial, National Road Championships
 3rd Overall Le Triptyque des Monts et Châteaux
 7th Ronde Van Vlaanderen Beloften
 9th Overall Tour de Normandie
 10th Ster van Zwolle
2016
 National Road Championships
2nd Road race
3rd Time trial
 3rd Overall Tour de Luxembourg
 6th Overall Istrian Spring Trophy
2017
 National Road Championships
2nd Road race
3rd Time trial
 2nd Le Samyn
 9th Overall Ster ZLM Toer
 9th Binche–Chimay–Binche
2018
 National Road Championships
2nd Time trial
2nd Road race
 6th Le Samyn
 9th Tour de l'Eurométropole
2019
 8th Grand Prix d'Isbergues
2020
 2nd Time trial, National Road Championships
 7th Le Samyn
2021
 National Road Championships
3rd Time trial
4th Road race

Grand Tour general classification results timeline

References

External links

 
 
 

1992 births
Living people
Luxembourgian male cyclists
Sportspeople from Luxembourg City
European Games competitors for Luxembourg
Cyclists at the 2015 European Games